The following is a list of each of the regional editions of TV Guide Magazine, which mentions the markets that each regional edition served and the years of publication. Each edition is listed under exactly one region (generally either for a single city, or a single or multiple neighboring states or provinces). Thus, for editions overlapping region lines, the listing appears in only one of the neighboring regions. For example, the Nebraska edition also included stations in Sioux City, Iowa and Sioux Falls, South Dakota.

During the period that TV Guide published local program listings from 1953 to 2005, the magazine did not print regional editions for the U.S. territories, although Puerto Rico has a similar magazine called Teve Guía. Also, three U.S. states, Delaware, South Dakota, and Wyoming, never had their own editions. The northern part of Delaware (part of the Philadelphia market) was served by the Philadelphia edition, and the southern part (part of the Salisbury market) by the Washington-Baltimore edition. Stations in eastern South Dakota (Sioux Falls market) appeared in the Nebraska edition, and subscribers in western South Dakota (Rapid City) automatically received the New York Metropolitan edition. The Northern Colorado edition almost exclusively concentrated on cable systems in Greeley and Fort Collins, while the subscribers in the western Wyoming markets of Riverton, Rock Springs, and Jackson, automatically received the Salt Lake editions.

The markets that served as the primary area, mostly those with white numbers on black channel bullets, are listed in bold text. In some editions, multiple stations appeared on the same channel, which required the editors to be creative in assigning channel bullets to stations. For example, the Montana edition at one time listed channel 2 stations in Billings (black bullet with white number), Spokane (white bullet with black number), Salt Lake (horizontally striped white bullet with black number), and Denver (white bullet with center black stripe containing white number).

Many of the dates are imprecise because exact dates of when editions went into and out of circulation are not easily available. The Oregon edition that started publishing on August 20, 1955, was the 33rd regional edition of TV Guide. According to the September 13, 1958, Utah-Idaho edition, there were 51 regional editions of TV Guide being printed in the United States.

Unless otherwise noted, regional editions in the United States can be assumed to have ended with the October 9, 2005, issue, after which TV Guide began publishing national listings based on time zone.

United States
{| class="wikitable sortable" 
|-
! State !! data-sort-type="date" | Edition !! Dates in existence !! Television market availability !! Circulation (1988) !! Notes
|-
| rowspan=4| Alabama || Alabama || data-sort-value="1959" | at least 1959–1963 || Birmingham; Montgomery; Huntsville; Dothan; Columbus, Georgia ||  || 
|-
| Gulf Coast || data-sort-value="1959" | at least by 1959 || Biloxi, Mobile-Pensacola, Panama City || 80,147 || 
|-
| Northern Alabama || data-sort-value="1962" | from at least Sept. 29, 1962 || Birmingham, Huntsville, Florence, Tuscaloosa, Anniston, Decatur, Nashville, Tennessee, Columbus, Mississippi || 150,295 || 
|-
| Southern Alabama || data-sort-value="1963" | from 1963 || Montgomery; Selma; Dothan; Columbus, Georgia || 57,456 || 
|-
| Alaska || Anchorage-Fairbanks || July 5, 1997 – December 26, 1998 || Anchorage, Fairbanks, Juneau || ||
|-
| rowspan=3| Arizona || Arizona || 1959–1962, 2004–2005 || Phoenix, Tucson, Yuma-El Centro, Flagstaff || ||
|-
| Phoenix || 1962–2004 || Phoenix, Yuma-El Centro, Flagstaff || 249,915 || 
|-
| Tucson || 1962–2004 || Tucson || 66,517 || 
|-
| Arkansas || Arkansas || data-sort-value="1959" | from 1959 || Little Rock, Fort Smith-Fayetteville (southern part), Monroe-El Dorado, Shreveport-Texarkana (until 1982) || 53,169 || 
|-
| rowspan=13| California || Bakersfield || data-sort-value="1996" | from 1996 || Bakersfield || ||
|-
| Santa Barbara-Bakersfield || 1982–1996 || Bakersfield, Santa Barbara || 179,543 || 
|-
| Central California || data-sort-value="1959" | at least 1959–1982 || Bakersfield, Fresno, Santa Barbara ||  || 
|-
| Coachella Valley || data-sort-value="1997" | from 1997 || Palm Springs ||  || 
|-
| Fresno || data-sort-value="1982" | from 1982 || Fresno, Bakersfield, parts of San Francisco, Salinas-Monterey and Sacramento (until 1994) || 59,359 || Became Fresno MediaOne edition in 1991
|-
| Los Angeles Metropolitan || data-sort-value="1966" | from July 23, 1966 || Los Angeles, Palm Springs (before 1997) || 1,281,144 || Became Ultimate Cable edition from 1998–2002; customized editions for area cable operators in Los Angeles and Orange counties was also published from 1997 to 2004
|-
| Northern California || data-sort-value="1954" | from July 24, 1954 || San Francisco-Oakland (until 1969), San Jose-Salinas (until 1969), Sacramento (primary), Chico-Redding, Eureka, Reno (until 1965) || 313,115 || 
|-
| Sacramento (Comcast) || 1997–2004 || Sacramento ||  || 
|-
| San Diego || data-sort-value="1966" | from July 23, 1966 || San Diego, Los Angeles (an edition for Cox Cable subscribers within the city limits was also published) || 240,256 || 
|-
| San Francisco County || 1997–2004 || San Francisco-Oakland (within San Francisco County) ||  || 
|-
| San Francisco Metropolitan || data-sort-value="1969" | from 1969 || San Francisco-Oakland, San Jose-Salinas-Monterey, Sacramento || 704,770 || 
|-
| Santa Barbara-Ventura || data-sort-value="1996" | from 1996 || Santa Barbara, Los Angeles (Ventura County portion) ||  || 
|-
| Southern California || 1953–July 16, 1966 || Los Angeles, San Diego, Santa Barbara ||  || 
|-
| rowspan=4| Colorado || Colorado || data-sort-value="1959" | at least by January 5, 1957 – 1979 || Denver, Colorado Springs-Pueblo, Albuquerque, Goodland ||  || 
|-
| Denver || data-sort-value="1972" | from 1972 || Denver (metro part) || 88,459 || 
|-
| Northern Colorado || data-sort-value="1979" | from 1979 || Denver (northern portion), Cheyenne|| 55,612 || 
|-
| Southern Colorado || data-sort-value="1979" | from 1979 || Colorado Springs-Pueblo, Grand Junction, Denver (southern portion) || 47,893 || 
|-
| rowspan=3| Connecticut || Connecticut Valley || data-sort-value="1958" | at least January 4, 1958 – 1960 || Hartford-New Haven, Springfield ||  || 
|-
| Hartford-New Haven || data-sort-value="1980" | from August 2, 1980 || Hartford-New Haven, Springfield, Massachusetts, New York City VHF stations || 167,577 || 
|-
| Western New England || 1960–July 26, 1980 || Hartford-New Haven, Springfield ||  || 
|-
| District of Columbia || Washington || data-sort-value="1994" | from 1994 || Washington ||  || 
|-
| rowspan=9| Florida || Central Florida || 1960–1977 || Orlando-Daytona Beach, Tampa-St. Petersburg, Ft. Myers ||  || 
|-
| Florida State || data-sort-value="1955" | at least February 19, 1955 – 1960 || Jacksonville, Orlando-Daytona Beach, Tampa-St. Petersburg, Ft. Myers ||  || 
|-
| Florida-Georgia || 1962–1973 || Jacksonville, Tallahassee-Thomasville, Albany ||  || 
|-
| Northern Florida || 1960–1962, from 1973 || Jacksonville, Gainesville, Tallahassee-Thomasville (Florida part, 1960–1962) || 63,942 || 
|-
| Orlando || data-sort-value="1977" | from 1977 || Orlando-Daytona Beach || 147,310 || 
|-
| Sarasota || 1977–1984 || Sarasota, Ft. Myers || || 
|-
| South Florida || data-sort-value="1958" | at least from 1958 || Miami, West Palm Beach || 223,680 || Was known as the Florida Gold Coast Edition until 1960.  Never included ZNS-TV in the Bahamas.
|-
| Tampa Bay || 1977–1984 || Tampa-St. Petersburg ||  || 
|-
| Tampa-Sarasota || data-sort-value="1984" | from 1984 || Tampa-St. Petersburg, Sarasota, Ft. Myers-Naples || 140,002 || 
|-
| rowspan=4| Georgia || Atlanta || data-sort-value="1980" | from August 1980 || Atlanta || 301,802 || 
|-
| Georgia || data-sort-value="1959" | at least 1959–1973 || Atlanta, Macon, Chattanooga ||  || 
|-
| North Georgia || 1973–August 1980 || Atlanta, Macon, Chattanooga ||  || 
|-
| South Georgia || data-sort-value="1973" | from 1973 || Columbus, Macon, Tallahassee-Thomasville, Albany || 65,577 || 
|-
| Hawaii || Hawaii (later renamed Hawaii-Oceanic Cable) || data-sort-value="1968" | from August 7, 1968 || Honolulu (including satellite stations until 1993)  || 56,916 || 
|-
| Idaho || Idaho || data-sort-value="1975" | from November 22, 1975 || Boise-Nampa, Twin Falls, Idaho Falls-Pocatello, Casper, Riverton, Rock Springs, Jackson || 44,842 || 
|-
| rowspan=6| Illinois || Chicago || at least by June 5, 1953 – 1965 || Chicago, Rockford, South Bend (until 1962) ||  || 
|-
| Eastern Illinois || data-sort-value="1962" | September 15, 1962– || Springfield, Peoria-Bloomington, Champaign-Decatur, Terre Haute || 83,979 || 
|-
| Chicago Metropolitan || data-sort-value="1965" | from 1965 || Chicago || 423,428 || 
|-
| Illinois || data-sort-value="1953" | at least November 13, 1953 – September 8, 1962 || Quad Cities (Illinois side, although issues were also sold on the Iowa side), Quincy-Hannibal, Springfield, Peoria, Champaign ||  || 
|-
| Northern Illinois || 1965–June 16, 1973 || Chicago (non-metro), Rockford ||  || 
|-
| Western Illinois || data-sort-value="1962" | September 15, 1962– || Quad Cities (Illinois side, although issues were also sold on the Iowa side) Quincy-Hannibal, Peoria-Bloomington, Springfield, Kirksville-Ottumwa || 92,896 || (Edition also sold in most of northeastern Missouri)
|-
| rowspan=4| Indiana || Central Indiana || at least by November 17, 1962 – 2004 || Indianapolis, Lafayette, Terre Haute || 183,506 || 
|-
| Evansville-Paducah || data-sort-value="1962" | September 15, 1962– || Evansville, Paducah-Cape Girardeau-Harrisburg || 82,584 || 
|-
| Indiana || data-sort-value="1955" | at least by November 19, 1955 – 1962 and 2004–2005 || Indianapolis, Lafayette, Terre Haute, Ft. Wayne, Champaign (until 1962) ||  ||
|-
| Northern Indiana || data-sort-value="1962" | from 1962 || Ft. Wayne, South Bend || 120,416 ||  
|-
| Iowa || Iowa || data-sort-value="1953" | at least by June 12, 1953 || Des Moines, Cedar Rapids-Waterloo, Dubuque, Fort Dodge, Quad Cities, Kirksville-Ottumwa || 148,222 ||  
|-
| rowspan=2| Kansas || Kansas State || data-sort-value="1960" | from 1960 || Wichita, Great Bend, Dodge City, Hays, Garden City || 61,749 || 
|-
| Wichita || data-sort-value="1957" | at least by August 3, 1957 – 1960 || Wichita, Great Bend, Hays ||  || 
|-
| Kentucky || Kentucky || 1956– || Louisville, Lexington (Evansville through September 8, 1962 edition), Cincinnati, Danville, Hazard, Campbellsville, KET (Kentucky Educational Television) affiliates in Elizabethtown, Somerset, Hazard, Morehead, Lexington, Owenton, and Louisville (under omnibus "E" and later "KET" channel slug) || 121,556 || 
|-
| rowspan=4| Louisiana || Louisiana || data-sort-value="1957" | at least 1957–1959, later from 1962 || Baton Rouge, Lafayette-Lake Charles, Alexandria || 130,822 || 
|-
| Louisiana-Mississippi || 1959–1962 || Baton Rouge, New Orleans, Lafayette-Lake Charles, Alexandria, Jackson, Meridian ||  || 
|-
| New Orleans || data-sort-value="1972" | from 1972 || New Orleans || 64,090 || 
|-
| Shreveport-Texarkana || data-sort-value="1983" | at least by 1983 || Shreveport-Texarkana, Lufkin-Nacogdoches || 72,607 || 
|-
| Maine || Maine || data-sort-value="1973" | July 21, 1973– || Portland, Bangor, Presque Isle || 90,207 || 
|-
| rowspan=2| Maryland || Baltimore || data-sort-value="1994" | from 1994 || Baltimore, Salisbury ||  || 
|-
| Baltimore-Washington || 1953–1994 || Washington, Baltimore, Salisbury || 539,485 || 
|-
| rowspan=6| Massachusetts || Boston || 1980–2004 || Boston, Providence-New Bedford, Manchester || 461,105 || 
|-
| Boston-Providence || 2004–2005 || Boston, Providence-New Bedford ||  || 
|-
| Eastern New England || 1960–1980 || Boston, Providence-New Bedford ||  || Was known as the Boston edition briefly in 1968
|-
| New England || data-sort-value="1953" | (Vol. 1, No. 1) April 3, 1953 – 1960 || Boston, Providence, Manchester, Portland ||  || 
|-
| Springfield-Chicopee-Holyoke || data-sort-value="1980" | from 1980 || Springfield, Hartford, Connecticut || 75,410 || 
|-
| Worcester || 1982–1987 || Boston, Springfield (Worcester area) ||  || 
|-
| rowspan=5| Michigan || Detroit || data-sort-value="1955" | at least by April 24, 1953 || Detroit, Lansing-Flint (until 1957), Toledo (until 1982) || 172,116 || 
|-
| Flint-Lansing || data-sort-value="1981" | from 1981 || Flint-Saginaw-Bay City, Lansing-Jackson || 127,314 || 
|-
| Grand Rapids || data-sort-value="1981" | from 1981 || Grand Rapids-Kalamazoo-Battle Creek-Muskegon || 83,924 || 
|-
| Michigan State || data-sort-value="1957" | at least 1957–1981 || Flint-Saginaw-Bay City, Lansing-Jackson, Grand Rapids-Kalamazoo-Battle Creek-Muskegon, Traverse City-Cadillac, Alpena ||  || 
|-
| Northern Michigan || data-sort-value="1981" | from 1981 || Traverse City-Cadillac, Alpena || 74,486 || 
|-
| rowspan=5| Minnesota || Minneapolis-St. Paul || data-sort-value="1960" | At least from December 3, 1955 || Minneapolis-St. Paul (metropolitan portion) || 143,800 || 
|-
| Minnesota State || data-sort-value="1955" | from at least July 16, 1955 || Minneapolis-St. Paul (non-metro), Duluth-Superior, Rochester-Austin-Mason City, La Crosse-Eau Claire, Alexandria, Mankato || 131,923 || 
|-
| Northern Minnesota || data-sort-value="1955" | at least by January 21, 1955 – 1958 || Duluth, Minneapolis-St. Paul (non-metro, north of city), Fargo ||  || 
|-
| Northwest || data-sort-value="1954" | at least by May 15, 1953 – 1955 || Duluth, Minneapolis-St. Paul, Rochester-Austin-Mason City, La Crosse-Eau Claire ||  || 
|-
| Southern Minnesota || 1955–1958 || Minneapolis-St. Paul, Rochester-Austin-Mason City, La Crosse-Eau Claire ||  || 
|-
| rowspan=4| Mississippi || Central Mississippi || 1979–2004 || Jackson, Meridian, Greenwood-Greenville, Tupelo (southern part) || 42,934 || 
|-
| Mississippi || 1962–1979 || Jackson, Meridian, Greenwood, Hattiesburg ||  || 
|-
| Mississippi State || 2004–2005 || Jackson, Meridian, Greenwood, Hattiesburg, Biloxi ||  || 
|-
| South Mississippi || 1979–2004 || Biloxi, Hattiesburg, Meridian || 45,541 || 
|-
| rowspan=3| Missouri || Kansas City || data-sort-value="1959" | at least by June 11, 1955 || Kansas City, Topeka, St. Joseph || 219,837 || 
|-
| Missouri || data-sort-value="1958" | at least by 1958 || Springfield, Joplin-Pittsburg, Jefferson City-Columbia, Ft. Smith-Fayetteville (northern part), Tulsa, OK || 118,013 || 
|-
| St. Louis || data-sort-value="1959" | at least by February 1, 1958 || St. Louis || 240,873 || 
|-
| Montana || Montana || data-sort-value="1965" | from December 4, 1965 || Billings, Helena, Great Falls, Butte, Missoula, Miles City, Glendive, Williston, and selected stations from Denver, Salt Lake, Spokane, and Lethbridge, Alberta.   || 27,907 || The only TV Guide edition that featured local broadcast listings from three different time zones - Mountain, Central (Williston, ND), and Pacific (Spokane, WA).
|-
| rowspan=2| Nebraska || Nebraska || data-sort-value="1954" | at least by January 22, 1954 || Omaha (until 1996), Lincoln-Hastings-Kearney, North Platte, Sioux City, Sioux Falls || 126,290 || Until 1979, split-run advertisements also mentioned McCook, Rapid City, and the entire state of Wyoming, but there were no listings for any television stations in those areas
|-
| Greater Omaha || data-sort-value="1996" | from 1996 || Omaha ||  || 
|-
| rowspan=3| Nevada || Las Vegas || 1997–2004 || Las Vegas ||  || 
|-
| Nevada || 1965–1997 and 2004–2005 || Las Vegas, Reno, Sacramento (area near Lake Tahoe, until 1990) || 76,885 || 
|-
| Reno || 1997–2004 || Reno, Sacramento (area near Lake Tahoe) ||  || 
|-
| rowspan=2| New Hampshire || New Hampshire || data-sort-value="1973" | from July 21, 1973 || Boston (New Hampshire part), Manchester, Portland (New Hampshire part) || 151,691 || 
|-
| Northern New England || 1960–1973 || Bangor, Portland, Manchester ||  || 
|-
| New Jersey || New Jersey-Pennsylvania || 1971–1982 (approximately) || served non-metro portions of New Jersey New York City VHF stations, Philadelphia ||  || 
|-
| rowspan=2| New Mexico || New Mexico || at least by December 3, 1960 – 1979; From 1981 || Albuquerque-Santa Fe, El Paso, Roswell, Carlsbad || 82,407 || 
|-
| Albuquerque || 1979–1981 || Albuquerque ||  || 
|-
| rowspan=11| New York || Albany || data-sort-value="1977" | from 1977 || Albany, Burlington-Plattsburgh (southern part) || 76,795 ||  
|-
| Binghamton || data-sort-value="1959" | at least by July 18, 1959 – 1965 || Binghamton, Elmira ||  || 
|-
| Buffalo Metropolitan || data-sort-value="1977" | from 1977 || Buffalo-Niagara Falls || 92,382 ||  
|-
| Central New York State || 1973–1977 || Syracuse ||  || 
|-
| Eastern New York State || data-sort-value="1965" |December 4, 1965 – 1977 || Albany, Utica, Syracuse (until 1973), Burlington-Plattsburgh (southern part) ||  || Split from New York State edition
|-
| New York Metropolitan || data-sort-value="1953" | from Vol. 1 No. 1 April 3, 1953 || New York City, Hartford major players || 1,600,174 ||   
|-
| New York State || data-sort-value="1955" | at least 1955–November 27, 1965 || Albany, Binghamton, Menands, Rochester, Schenectady, Syracuse, Utica, Watertown ||  || Split into East and West editions
|-
| Pennsylvania-New York || data-sort-value="1973" | from 1973 || Binghamton, Elmira, Wilkes-Barre-Scranton, Syracuse (2004–2005 only) || 65,066 || 
|-
| Rochester || data-sort-value="1977" | from 1977 || Rochester || 57,063 || 
|-
| Syracuse || 1977–2004 || Syracuse, Utica, Watertown (except eastern St. Lawrence County) || 62,718 || 
|-
| Western New York State || data-sort-value="1965" | from December 4, 1965 || Buffalo, Rochester (served non-metro areas from 1977 onward) || 54,237 || Split from New York State edition
|-
| rowspan=4| North Carolina || Carolina-Tennessee || data-sort-value="1960" | March 26, 1960-August 1980 || Knoxville, Bristol-Kingsport-Johnson City, Asheville-Greenville-Spartanburg ||  || 
|-
| Charlotte || data-sort-value="1980" | from 1980 || Charlotte, Greensboro-High Point-Winston-Salem || 165,165 || 
|-
| Eastern North Carolina || data-sort-value="1980" | from 1980 || Raleigh-Durham, Wilmington, Greenville-New Bern-Washington || 152,024 || 
|-
| North Carolina || data-sort-value="1956" | at least by December 22, 1956 – 1980 || Charlotte, Greensboro-High Point-Winston-Salem, Raleigh-Durham, Wilmington, Greenville-New Bern-Washington ||  || 
|-
| rowspan=2| North Dakota || Dakota-Winnipeg || 1958–1965 || Winnipeg, Brandon, Fargo, Bismarck, Minot, Aberdeen, Pembina ||  || 
|-
| North Dakota || data-sort-value="1965" | from 1965 || Fargo-Grand Forks, Bismarck-Minot-Williston, Aberdeen (until 1971), Pembina (until 1975), Dickinson (after 1978) || 47,343 || 
|-
| rowspan=13| Ohio || Central Ohio || 1972–February 24, 1979 || Dayton, Lima, Zanesville, Columbus (outside metro area) ||  || Split into Lima and Columbus Metropolitan
|-
| Cincinnati || 1980–2004 || Cincinnati || 163,650 || 
|-
| Cincinnati-Columbus-Dayton || data-sort-value="1953" | (Vol. 1, No. 1) April 3, 1953 – 1956 || Cincinnati, Columbus, Dayton ||  || 
|-
| Cincinnati-Dayton || 1972–1980 || Cincinnati, Dayton ||  || 
|-
| Cleveland || data-sort-value="1959" | at least July 24, 1953 – 1975 || Cleveland, Youngstown, Erie ||  || 
|-
| Cleveland Metropolitan ||  data-sort-value="1975" |from 1975 || Cleveland || 53,490 ||  
|-
| Columbus Metropolitan || data-sort-value="1979" | March 3, 1979 – 2004 || Columbus || 106,036 || Split from Central Ohio
|-
| Dayton || 1980–2004 || Dayton || 119,887 ||  
|-
| Lima || data-sort-value="1979" | March 3, 1979 – 1982 || || ||Split from Central Ohio.  Renamed Toledo-Lima
|-
| Northern Ohio || data-sort-value="1975" | from 1975 || Cleveland (outside metro area) || 70,869 ||  
|-
| Southern Ohio || data-sort-value="1954" | at least by October 30, 1954 – 1972; Revived 2004–2005 || Dayton, Zanesville, Cincinnati (outside metro area in 1957-73 edition), Columbus (outside metro area in 1957-73 edition) ||  || 
|-
| Toledo-Lima || data-sort-value="1982" | from 1982 || Toledo, Lima || 70,287 || Was Lima.
|-
| Youngstown-Erie || data-sort-value="1975" | from 1975 || Youngstown, Erie || 168,683 ||  
|-
| rowspan=3| Oklahoma || Oklahoma || data-sort-value="1957" | at least by October 27, 1956 – 1965, 1970–1981 and 2004–2005 || Oklahoma City, Tulsa, Lawton-Wichita Falls, Texas (1970–1981 and 2004–2005), Ada-Ardmore-Sherman-Denison (1970–1981 and 2004–2005) ||  || 
|-
| Oklahoma City || 1965–1970, 1981–2004 || Oklahoma City, Lawton-Wichita Falls, Texas, Ada-Ardmore-Sherman-Denison || 105,374 ||  
|-
| Tulsa || 1965–1970, 1981–2004 || Tulsa || 40,459 ||  
|-
| rowspan=4| Oregon || Eugene || 1977–1984 || Eugene, Bend ||  || 
|-
| Oregon/Oregon State || data-sort-value="1955" | August 20, 1955 – 1977; 1984–October 16, 2005 || Portland, Eugene, Klamath Falls, Medford, Roseburg, Coos Bay, Bend || 52,881 || The Portland edition was separated from this edition in 1961, and merged back into it in 2003; the Eugene edition separated from this edition from 1977–1984; during this time, the edition's name was changed to "Southern Oregon State"
|-
| Portland || data-sort-value="1961" | July 15, 1961 – December 26, 2003 || Portland, Salem, Vancouver, Washington || 108,423 || Was merged with Oregon State edition in 2003; Ultimate Cable/Paragon/AT&T/Comcast (large) edition was published from October 9, 1999 to October 1, 2005
|-
| Southern Oregon State || 1977–1984 || Eugene, Klamath Falls, Medford, Roseburg, Coos Bay ||  || Derived from Oregon State edition during the time the Eugene edition was being published
|-
| rowspan=8| Pennsylvania || Central Pennsylvania || data-sort-value="1965" | from 1965 || Harrisburg-Lancaster-York-Lebanon, Scranton, Wilkes-Barre, Philadelphia major players, New York City VHF stations || 171,254 || 
|-
| Hazleton-Williamsport || data-sort-value="1959" | at least by December 1, 1955 – 1965 || ||  || This edition served cable systems in these two cities
|-
| Johnstown-Altoona || 1975–2004 || Johnstown-Altoona, Pittsburgh major players || 71,796 || Merged with Pittsburgh edition in 2004
|-
| Northeast Pennsylvania || data-sort-value="1955" | at least by July 30, 1955 – 1957 || Wilkes Barre-Scranton ||  || 
|-
| Philadelphia || data-sort-value="1953" | from Vol. 1, No. 1 April 3, 1953 || Philadelphia included New York City VHF stations since 1981(metro portion) || 561,186 || 
|-
| Pittsburgh (Metro) || data-sort-value="1959" | July 31, 1953 (issue #18) || Pittsburgh (Including Johnstown-Altoona, Wheeling-Steubenville, Clarksburg-Weston and Youngstown) || 262,554 || Pittsburgh stations were listed first; each would have their own edition but was still listed in this one until their editions merged back into the Pittsburgh edition in 2004; experimental large format was published in 1991; was Pittsburgh Metro edition from 1975 to 2004
|-
| Scranton-Wilkes-Barre || 1956–1973 || Wilkes Barre-Scranton ||  || Was merged into the Pennsylvania-New York edition, according to the Library of Congress
|-
| Southeast Pennsylvania || data-sort-value="1973" | June 25, 1973– || Harrisburg-Lancaster-York-Lebanon, Philadelphia major players, Baltimore major players (non-metro, west of city) || 99,215 || 
|-
| Rhode Island || Providence || 1980–2004 || Providence-New Bedford, Boston major players, Hartford, Connecticut major players || 202,367 || 
|-
| rowspan=2| South Carolina || Greenville-Spartanburg-Asheville || data-sort-value="1980" | from 1980 || Greenville-Spartanburg-Asheville || 98,319 || 
|-
| South Carolina || data-sort-value="1959" | at least by 1959 || Columbia, Charleston, Florence, Augusta, Savannah || 116,398 || 
|-
| rowspan=5| Tennessee || Bristol-Kingsport-Johnson City || data-sort-value="1980" | August 1980– || Bristol-Kingsport-Johnson City || 70,643 || 
|-
| Knoxville-Chattanooga || data-sort-value="1980" | August 1980 – 2005 || Knoxville, Chattanooga || 57,327 || 
|-
| Memphis || data-sort-value="1960" | February 27, 1960 – 2005 || Memphis, Jackson-Lexington, Tupelo (Columbus and West Point after 1980), Jonesboro (added in 1967), Greenville-Greenwood (after 1980) || 106,989 || 
|-
| Nashville || data-sort-value="1980" | February 27, 1960 – 2005 || Nashville, Bowling Green (Paducah-Cape Girardeau through September 8, 1962 issue) || 130,717 || Experimental large format was published in 1991
|-
| Tennessee || data-sort-value="1956" | August 25, 1956 – February 20, 1960 || Nashville, Jackson, Memphis, Tupelo, Paducah-Cape Girardeau ||  || 
|-
| rowspan=10| Texas || Austin || 2000–2005 || Austin ||  || 
|-
| Dallas-Fort Worth || data-sort-value="1972" | from 1972 || Dallas-Ft. Worth (metro portion) || 162,659 || 
|-
| El Paso || 1960–1981 || El Paso, Roswell ||  ||
|-
| Houston || data-sort-value="1977" | from 1977 || Houston || 176,012 ||  
|-
| North Texas || data-sort-value="1955" | at least by February 19, 1955 || Dallas-Ft. Worth (outside metro area from 1972), Ada-Denton, Tyler, Waco-Temple (until September 17, 1960 and October 5, 1968 to 2005), Wichita Falls-Lawton || 78,384 ||  
|-
| San Antonio || 1991–2003 || San Antonio ||  || 
|-
| South Texas || data-sort-value="1959" | at least 1959–2000 || San Antonio (until 1991), Austin, Corpus Christi, Laredo (from October 5, 1968), Harlingen-Weslaco-Brownsville (from October 5, 1968), Waco-Temple (from September 24, 1960 to September 28, 1968) || 73,828 ||  
|-
| South Texas (revised, with cable listings) || 2000–2005 || San Antonio, Corpus Christi, Laredo, Harlingen-Weslaco-Brownsville ||  || 
|-
| Southeast Texas || data-sort-value="1959" | at least by 1959 || Houston (outside metro area from 1977), Beaumont-Port Arthur, Bryan-College Station, Lufkin, Lake Charles, Louisiana || 58,778 || 
|-
| West Texas || data-sort-value="1959" | from 1959 || Amarillo, Lubbock, Midland-Odessa, Abilene-Sweetwater, San Angelo || 57,214 || 
|-
| rowspan=2| Utah || Salt Lake || data-sort-value="1975" | from November 22, 1975 || Salt Lake City, Grand Junction (until 1979) || 112,043 || 
|-
| Utah-Idaho || data-sort-value="1958" | September 13, 1958 – November 15, 1975 || Salt Lake City, Boise, Twin Falls, Idaho Falls, Casper, Riverton, Grand Junction || ||
|-
| Vermont || Vermont || data-sort-value="1975" | from November 22, 1975 (Most of Vermont had previously been covered by the Montreal-St. Lawrence edition)|| Burlington-Plattsburgh, Watertown (eastern St. Lawrence County) || 45,486 || 
|-
| rowspan=5| Virginia || Central Virginia || 1962–2004 || Roanoke, Bluefield-Beckley-Oak Hill (merged into Virginia State edition in 2004) || 63,041 || 
|-
| Eastern Virginia || 1962–2004 || Norfolk, Richmond, Charlottesville-Harrisonburg; Merged into Virginia in 2004 || 157,101 ||  
|-
| Virginia || 1957–1962 || Norfolk, Richmond, Bristol-Kingsport-Johnson City, Roanoke ||  || 
|-
| Virginia State || 2004–2005 || Norfolk, Richmond, Charlottesville-Harrisonburg, Roanoke-Lynchburg ||  || 
|-
| Virginia-Carolina || data-sort-value="1955" | at least by April 16, 1955 – 1957 || Norfolk, Roanoke, Richmond, Raleigh-Durham, Greensboro-High Point-Winston-Salem ||  || 
|-
| rowspan=5| Washington || Eastern Washington State || data-sort-value="1957" | at least by 1957 || Spokane (non-metro only from 1979; Returned in 2004 merger), Yakima, Kennewick-Pasco-Richland, Moses Lake (during KBAS's 1957-61 existence), Walla Walla (for the brief time in 1960 that KNBS-TV lasted), Wenatchee (during KCWT's existence), Pullman, Lewiston, Moscow, and, until 1965, Missoula and Great Falls || 47,379 || 
|-
| Puget Sound || At least by April 30, 1960 – 1972; revived 1997–2004 || Seattle, Bellingham; also Vancouver and Victoria until 1965 ||  || During the latter years of publication, the edition served as cable guide listings
|-
| Seattle-Tacoma || At least by September 2, 1961 – 1972 and 2004–2005 || Seattle ||  || Ultimate Cable edition was published from 1998 to 2002
|-
| Spokane || 1979–2004 || Spokane (metro area) || 48,422 || Was merged into Eastern Washington edition in 2004
|-
| Western Washington State || 1954–1961; 1972–2004 || Seattle, Bellingham; also Vancouver and Victoria || 310,552 || Edition was renamed "Seattle-Tacoma" in 2004
|-
| rowspan=3| West Virginia || Huntington || data-sort-value="1953" | at least in 1953 || Huntington ||  || 
|-
| West Virginia || data-sort-value="1957" | at least by March 2, 1957 || Charleston-Huntington, Bluefield-Beckley-Oak Hill, Parkersburg, Wheeling, Lewisburg, Clarksburg-Weston, Columbus, Athens, Portsmouth, Hazard, KET (Kentucky Educational Television) affiliates in Pikeville, Ashland, Hazard, and Morehead (under omnibus "KET" channel slug) || 137,246 || 
|-
| Wheeling-Steubenville || 1975–2004 || Wheeling-Steubenville, Clarksburg-Fairmont (merged with Pittsburgh edition in 2004) || 106,039 || 
|-
| rowspan=5| Wisconsin || Illinois-Wisconsin || data-sort-value="1973" | June 23, 1973 – 2001; 2004–2005 || Madison, Milwaukee, Rockford, Chicago (Northern areas) || 241,338 ||  
|-
| Madison || 2001–2004 || Madison ||  || 
|-
| Milwaukee Metro || 2001–2004 || Milwaukee ||  || 
|-
| Northern Wisconsin || data-sort-value="1973" | from June 23, 1973 || Green Bay, Wausau-Rhinelander, Marquette, Milwaukee (Northern Metro) || 166,183 || 
|-
| Wisconsin || data-sort-value="1954" | (Issue #46) February 12, 1954 – June 16, 1973 || Milwaukee', Madison, Green Bay-Fond du Lac, Wausau-Rhinelander, Eau Claire-La Crosse, Marquette ||  || 
|}

Source for 1988 circulation figures: Audit Bureau of Circulation, June 30, 1988, Consumer Magazine and Agri-Media Rates and Data, January 27, 1989, pp. 465–67.

Canada
Beginning on December 4, 1965, TV Guide split some of its editions listing both American and Canadian stations. An article called The Canadian Report was then launched in those editions sold primarily or solely in Canada. The Canadian edition of TV Guide split off into its own publication in January 1977. On November 5, 2005, all remaining editions of TV Guide were consolidated to two editions, one for Eastern Canada and one for Western Canada. The print edition of TV Guide ended after the November 25, 2006, issue, though the publication continues as a web magazine (which was incorporated into another website, The Loop by Sympatico, in December 2012), with occasional print specials sold at newsstands.

There were no TV Guide editions for Newfoundland and Labrador, or for the northern territories. Some communities, such as Dawson Creek, British Columbia, and Thunder Bay, Ontario, also had no TV Guide coverage. Television listings in these regions were usually provided by local newspapers and/or local magazines. One such example is the Newfoundland Herald, which features television listings for the province, along with entertainment news and light features.TV Guide editions sold in Quebec are generally limited to Anglophone communities, and featured only local listings for Montreal, Sherbrooke, and/or Ottawa. TV Guides francophone counterpart is TV Hebdo'', which features television listings for most stations in Quebec and the Ottawa Valley. Published by Québecor Média, it remains in publication to this day.  The November 6, 1954 (Chicago edition) of TV Guide has a list of Editions that TV Guide serves, and gift subscriptions are available for 29 U.S states (plus the District of Columbia), and Canada is mentioned at the end of the list as: Canada (Toronto, Hamilton, Windsor, Vancouver).

Note: Market availability refers to the television markets in which a particular edition was available. Many editions also contained listings for other markets in which they were not available. For example, New York City listings appeared in many adjacent editions, although only the New York Metropolitan Edition was ever available in New York City.

References

Consumer Magazine and Farm Publication Rates and Data, Standard Rates and Data Service, Inc.

External links
 [possible virus in archived page according to ZoneAlarm]

Editions